The Sydney Peace Prize is awarded by the Sydney Peace Foundation,
a non profit organisation associated with the University of Sydney. The prize promotes peace with justice and the practice of nonviolence. It aims to encourage public interest and discussion about issues of peace, social justice, human rights, and non-violent conflict resolution.

Support
The City of Sydney is a major supporter of the Sydney Peace Prize. This involves a significant financial contribution along with other in-kind support in order to foster peace with justice.

The prize
Over three months each year, the Sydney Peace Prize jury – comprising seven individuals who represent corporate, media, academic and community sector interests – assesses the merits of the nominees' efforts to promote peace with justice. It is awarded to an organisation or individual:

 who has made significant contributions to global peace including improvements in personal security and steps towards eradicating poverty, and other forms of structural violence
 whose role and responsibilities enable the recipient to use the prize to further the cause of peace with justice
 whose work illustrates the philosophy and principles of non-violence

Considerations
The jury has been prepared to make some controversial choices. Sydney Peace Foundation Founder, Emeritus Professor Stuart Rees, said, "The initiators of the Sydney Peace Prize aimed to influence public interest in peace with justice, an ideal which is often perceived as controversial. The choice of a non-controversial candidate for a peace prize would be a safe option but unlikely to prompt debate or to increase understanding. Consensus usually encourages compliance, often anaesthetises and seldom informs."

Prize winners
 1998 – Professor Muhammad Yunus, the founder of the Grameen Bank for the poor and Nobel Peace Prize recipient
 1999 – Archbishop Emeritus Desmond Tutu, Nobel Peace Prize recipient
 2000 – Xanana Gusmão, the poet-artist and president of East Timor
 2001 – Sir William Deane, the former Governor-General of Australia
 2002 – Mary Robinson, former United Nations High Commissioner for Human Rights
 2003 – Dr. Hanan Ashrawi, Palestinian academic and human rights campaigner
 2004 – Arundhati Roy, Indian novelist and peace activist
 2005 – Olara Otunnu, United Nations Under Secretary General for Children and Armed Conflict from Uganda
 2006 – Irene Khan, Secretary General of Amnesty International
 2007 – Hans Blix, chairman of the UN Weapons of Mass Destruction Commission
 2008 – Patrick Dodson, chairman of the Lingiari Foundation
 2009 – John Pilger, Australian journalist and documentary maker
 2010 – Vandana Shiva, Indian social justice and environmental activist, eco-feminist and author
 2011 – Noam Chomsky, American linguist and activist
 2012 – Sekai Holland, Zimbabwean Senator
 2013 – Cynthia Maung, Burmese doctor
 2014 – Julian Burnside, Australian barrister, human rights and refugee advocate
 2015 – George Gittoes, Australian artist who chronicles conflicts around the world
 2016 – Naomi Klein, Canadian journalist, author and prominent activist for climate justice
 2017 – Black Lives Matter, International civil rights activist movement
 2018 – Joseph E. Stiglitz, American economist and academic
2019 – Tarana Burke and Tracey Spicer, American founders of the #MeToo Movement
2020 – Midnight Oil, Australian rock band
2021–2022 – The Uluru Statement from the Heart

Gold medal for Peace with Justice
The foundation also occasionally awards a special gold medal for significant contributions to peace and justice. Winners of the gold medal include South African statesman Nelson Mandela, 14th Dalai Lama Tenzin Gyatso, Japanese Buddhist leader Daisaku Ikeda, WikiLeaks publisher Julian Assange, Costa Rican Christina Figueres and Australian band Midnight Oil.

Notes

External links 

 Sydney Peace Foundation

Australian humanitarian awards
Culture of Sydney
Peace awards
Awards established in 1998